The Universidad Nacional de la Amazonía Peruana (UNAP) was created on 14 January 1961 by Law 13498, given by the government of Peru's President Manuel Prado Ugarteche, responding to various needs that the Loreto community had, until then, making, a law order to have a higher education institution in Iquitos.

History 
In its beginnings, the university possessed a School of Chemical-Industrial Engineering, the School of Agronomy, the School of Mechanics and Electricity, and various technical institutes and training centers for workers. Besides, it provided for the operation of a Research Institute of Natural Resources and an Anthropological Institute.

To make the functioning of the newly created institution a reality, and following article 7 of Law 13498, the Board of Directors of the National University of the Peruvian Amazon was created, whose objective was to formulate the organization's plan, financing, and operation of the institution.

On 13 April 1962, the Preliminary Statute of UNAP was approved utilizing Supreme Decree 21, which consisted of seven titles and one hundred and eighteen articles.

The inaugural ceremony was held on 31 May 1962, in the Ramón Castilla Hall of the Maynas Provincial Council, which was chaired by Dr. Eduardo de Souza Peixoto H., president of the Board of Directors, and with the presence of the members of the Board of Trustees, the authorities of the town and the general public.

On 4 June 1962, the inauguration of the first academic year of UNAP took place, under the responsibility of Dr. Emilio Gordillo Angulo, director of the School of General Studies (basic cycle).

The first University Assembly was installed in 1964, in which it was agreed to change the name of "schools" to "faculties," conforming the following: Faculty of Chemical-Industrial Engineering, Faculty of Agronomy and Forestry, Faculty of Education, Faculty of Sciences and Humanities (the latter, trained biologists and physicists-mathematicians). In 1969, and by legal mandate, the faculties changed their denomination, becoming "academic programs," which were organized by academic departments. For almost fifteen years, the denomination of academic programs was in force until the University Law 23733, promulgated on 9 December 1983, restored the System of Faculties in the universities of the country, which is still in force today.

Present
On 8 January 2018, UNAP received recognition from its local community during a ceremony for the 154th Anniversary of Iquitos. The recognition was presented by their towns mayor Adela Jiménez Mera.

Studies

See also 
 Education in Peru
 List of universities in Peru

References

External links 
 Official website

Public universities in Peru